This is a list of schools worldwide that identify as open universities, either as part of their titles or as an explicit tenet of their educational philosophy and methods. Open education is a core value for these institutions; they are not just secondary offshoots from more traditional universities.

The information shown for each school is deliberately limited. Each university listed here is linked to an existing article, where more information and verifiable references can be found.

(Column headings: 'DL' = distance learning, 'PC' = physical campus)

Africa

Asia

Oceania

Europe

North America, Central America and the Caribbean

South America

References

Open universities
Open